Newnes is an abandoned oil shale mining site of the Wolgan Valley in New South Wales, Australia. It may also refer to:

 Newnes (surname), list of people with the surname
 Newnes baronets, extinct baronetcy in the United Kingdom
 Newnes Glacier, glacier in Antarctica 
 Newnes railway line, defunct railway line in Australia 
 Frank Newnes Glacier, glacier in Antarctica 
 Lady Newnes Bay, bay in Antarctica 
 George Newnes Ltd, British publisher